St Leonard's Park Ponds is a  biological Site of Special Scientific Interest east of Horsham in West Sussex.

These ponds and adjacent woodland provide habitats for a wide variety of dragonflies and damselflies, including some uncommon species such as the variable damselfly  The banks have rich flora including the nationally rare yellow centaury. There are also several unusual mosses and liverworts.

The park is not open to the public, but a public footpath runs along the north bank of the ponds.

References

Sites of Special Scientific Interest in West Sussex